Maniema is one of 26 provinces of the Democratic Republic of the Congo. Its capital is Kindu.

Toponymy
Henry Morton Stanley explored the area, calling it Manyema.

Geography
Maniema borders the provinces of Sankuru to the west, Tshopo to the north, North Kivu and South Kivu to the east, and Lomami and Tanganyika to the south.

Maniema province has 7 territories, which are:

 Kabambare
 Kailo
 Kasongo
 Kibombo
 Lubutu
 Pangi
 Punia

Political divisions
Maniema consists of the city of Kindu and seven territories: Punia, Pangi, Lubutu, Kibombo, Kasongo, Kailo and Kabambare.  The city of Kindu has the communes of Alunguli, Kasuku and Mikelenge

Economy

Mining is the main industry in the province and diamonds, copper, gold and cobalt are mined outside of Kindu.

Kailo Territory is home to open pit wolframite and Cassiterite mines.

Education
University of Kindu

See also
Maniema District
Tippu Tip
 Kuba Kingdom

References

External links

  

 
Provinces of the Democratic Republic of the Congo